Wallpaper Engine is an application for Windows with a companion app on Android which allows users to use and create animated and interactive wallpapers, similar to the defunct Windows DreamScene. Wallpapers are shared through the Steam Workshop functionality as user-created downloadable content. It features its own rendering engine and provides a wallpaper editor, allowing for the creation of 2D and 3D wallpapers, including a particle system editor and a fork of JavaScript called SceneScript for additional wallpaper logic. It also supports using video files, audio files, web-pages and some 3D applications as wallpapers.

History 

A proposal outlining the general idea of the software was added to Steam Greenlight in December 2015. The application was subsequently released as a paid product on Steam in October 2016 as an early access title. After three years of development, the software left its early access stage in November 2018.
In August 2019, Wallpaper Engine was announced to be one of the release titles for Steam China.

Despite not being a game, Wallpaper Engine is one of the most used apps of Steam, being located in Steam's Top 25 played games in July 2019 and Top 10 played games in November 2021.

References

External links 
 
 Wallpaper Engine on Steam

Utilities for Windows
C++ software
Windows multimedia software
2016 software
Windows-only software